Creaney is a surname. Notable people with the surname include:

Gerry Creaney (b. 1970), Scottish footballer (Celtic FC)
James Creaney (b. 1988), Scottish footballer (Dumbarton FC)
Jim Creaney (b. 1964), Scottish footballer (Dumbarton FC)
John Creaney (1933–2008), lawyer in Northern Ireland